Horseshoe Crater is a volcanic crater at the confluence of Radian Glacier and Pipecleaner Glacier in the Royal Society Range of Victoria Land, Antarctica. It was named descriptively by the New Zealand Geographic Board (1994) following work in the area by a New Zealand Geological Survey field party, 1977–78, from the horseshoe shape of the crater.

References

Volcanoes of Victoria Land
Scott Coast